The county governor of Nordland county in Norway represents the central government administration in the county. The office of county governor is a government agency of the Kingdom of Norway.

In 1688, the government of Norway established Nordland as an amt (or county). Originally it included most of Northern Norway except for Finnmark. The southern border of Nordland was the Bindalsfjorden, a little further north than today's county border. In 1787, the northern part of Nordland was separated from Nordland and transferred to Finnmark county to the north. In 1852, the southern border of the county was adjusted to include Sør-Bindalen in the county.

From 1844 until 1918, the county was subordinate to the Diocesan Governor of Tromsø who was the civil governor of the Diocese of Tromsø. 

The county governor is the government's representative in the county. The governor carries out the resolutions and guidelines of the Storting and government. This is done first by the county governor performing administrative tasks on behalf of the ministries. Secondly, the county governor also monitors the activities of the municipalities and is the appeal body for many types of municipal decisions.

Names
The word for county (amt or fylke) has changed over time. On 1 January 2021, the title was again changed to the gender-neutral .

List of county governors
Nordland county has had the following governors:

References

 
Nordland